Billy Hill was an American country music group founded by singer/songwriter/guitarists Dennis Robbins, Bob DiPiero and John Scott Sherrill, along with Reno Kling (bass guitar) and Martin Parker (drums). Before the group's foundation, Robbins had been a member of The Rockets (later The Detroit Wheels), and Kling played bass for Steve Earle. Sherrill and Robbins alternated as lead vocalists, but credited the frontman role to a fictional character named Billy Hill and wrote a biography on the character.

The band recorded one album for Reprise Records and charted two singles on the Billboard country charts. Their biggest hit was "Too Much Month at the End of the Money" which reached No. 25 on the Billboard country charts. After disbanding in 1990, Robbins became a solo artist for Giant. DiPiero and Sherrill have continued working as songwriters.

In 2003, Marty Stuart recorded "Too Much Month at the End of the Money" for his 2003 album Country Music; his version reached No. 54 on the Billboard country charts.

Discography

Albums
 I Am Just a Rebel (1989) (Reprise)

Singles

Notes:
A "Nickel in My Name" did not chart on Hot Country Songs, but peaked at No. 10 on Hot Country Radio Breakouts.

Guest singles

References

Country music groups from Tennessee
Musical groups established in 1989
Musical groups disestablished in 1990
Musical quintets
Reprise Records artists
Bands with fictional stage personas